The Regional Council of Alsace was the regional council of the French region of Alsace from 1982 to 2015. As a result of reforms, the administrative region of Alsace merged with two other regions to form Grand Est, effective 1 January 2016, at which point the regional councils of Alsace, Lorraine, and Champagne-Ardenne were superseded by the Regional Council of Grand Est.

Composition (by party)

2004

1998

1992

1986

Former presidents 

 André Bord (1974–1976)
 Pierre Schiélé (1976–1980)
 Marcel Rudloff (1980–1996)
 Adrien Zeller (1996–2009)
 André Reichardt (2009–2010)
 Philippe Richert (2010–2015)

References

Politics of Alsace
Alsace